Tsentralnyi District may refer to the following places in Ukraine:

Tsentralnyi District, Dnipro, city district of Dnipro
Tsentralnyi District, Mariupol, city district of Mariupol
Tsentralnyi District, Mykolaiv, city district of Mykolaiv
Tsentralnyi District, Odessa, city district of Odessa
Tsentralnyi District, Simferopol, city district of Simferopol